The 2015 Rally America championship was the eleventh season of the Rally America series. The Rally America series is currently the premiere stage rally championship in the United States. The championship was won by the team of David Higgins and Craig Drew, representing Subaru Rally Team USA in their #75 2015 Subaru Impreza WRX STI. The team completed a perfect season, having won all 8 events. Higgins scored only six points shy of double the score achieved by championship runner's up, Subaru Impreza driver Piotr Fetela. Another Subaru driver, Lauchlin O'Sullivan was third in the championship at season's end.

More than just Higgins, Subaru drivers dominated the championship with only two of 24 podium results not collected by Imprezas. Mitsubishi Lancer driver George Plsek was third at the Oregon Trail Rally and Ford Fiesta driver Ken Block was second at the New England Forest Rally.

The victory was Higgins fifth consecutive title, overtaking Travis Pastrana to become the most successful driver in the history of Rally America.

Race calendar and results

The 2015 Rally America Championship was as follows:

Championship standings 
This table represents the championship standings from the 2015 Rally America season. Competitors that start each event get one point, competitors that finish get another point, and then further points are determined by placing order at the end of the event. 1st place receives 20 points, 2nd place receives 15 points, 3rd receives 12 points and so on. The table to the underneath shows how points are distributed. 

*In the above table, where noted, certain events and their points are dropped from the championship total. This is because there are only 6 allowed events in the national championship. This allows competitors that race in all 8 events to drop their two worst scores leaving them with 6 total races. In cases such as Higgins, there is little strategy involved since he won all 8 events and they all weighed equally on his score. In O'Sullivans case, however, eliminating the two worst races brings the score into balance. Without this measure, Piotr Fetela would have bested O'Sullivan because of total outright points. However, any starting and finishing points will count towards a competitors total, which is why Higgins' omissions are worth 2 points, for example.

References

External links
Official website

Rally America seasons
Rally America
Rally America